The Battle of Homs (or Battle of Hims) may refer to:
First Battle of Homs (1260)
Second Battle of Homs (1281)
Battle of Wadi al-Khazandar (1299)
Battle of Homs (1832)
Siege of Homs (2011–2014)
2012 Homs offensive

See also
Battle of Emesa (272)
Siege of Emesa (636)
Battle of Marj al-Saffar, Spring 1303